The Women's 59 kg weightlifting competitions at the 2020 Summer Olympics in Tokyo took place on 27 July at the Tokyo International Forum. This was the first ever 59 kg Olympic competition after the weight categories were reorganized in 2018.

Kuo Hsing-chun set three Olympic records to win her first Olympic gold after her bronze medal at the 2016 Summer Olympics in the 58 kg competition. Polina Guryeva won the silver medal,  the first ever Olympic medal for Turkmenistan, and Mikiko Ando won the bronze for the host nation, her first Olympic medal.

In group B, Canada's Tali Darsigny, Germany's Sabine Kusterer, Italy's Maria Grazia Alemanno and Australia's Erika Yamasaki earned their spots in top 14. Botswana's Magdeline Moyengwa and Alexandra Escobar of Ecuador failed to finish their attempts, thus they were eliminated from the event.

Records

During the competition, Kuo Hsing-chun set three Olympic records: in snatch (103), clean and jerk (133), and total (236).

Results

References

Weightlifting at the 2020 Summer Olympics
Olymp
Women's events at the 2020 Summer Olympics